Calkin Glacier is a glacier just west of Sentinel Peak, flowing north from the Kukri Hills toward the terminus of Taylor Glacier in Victoria Land. It was charted by the British Antarctic Expedition, 1910–13, under Robert Falcon Scott, and named by the Advisory Committee on Antarctic Names for Parker Calkin, United States Antarctic Research Program geologist who made investigations in the area during 1960–61 and 1961–62.

References
 

Glaciers of McMurdo Dry Valleys